The characters in the two American animated television shows Secret Mountain Fort Awesome, and its spin-off, Uncle Grandpa, are created by Peter Browngardt. The two shows are produced by Cartoon Network Studios for Cartoon Network.

Secret Mountain Fort Awesome characters

Main

Festro 
Festro is one of the five main protagonists of one of Peter Browngardt's Animated television series, Secret Mountain Fort Awesome on Cartoon Network.

Festro is purple with green eyes, two large tusks, and 2 smaller fangs in between. He is quite muscular and only wears a pair of briefs and a pair of brocro sneakers. He has black hair (spikes) and a bald spot at the top. Festro also has purple knuckles on his fingers.

Festro is brash, crude, selfish, and inconsiderate. He has the personality of your typical college frat boy, as all he wants to do is slack off and party, and loves to punch himself in the face. He rarely takes responsibility for any of his actions and is usually taking advantage of his friends.

Despite his disgusting behavior, Festro has moments where he owns up to his mistakes. He also has moments where he will do anything to defend his friends.

Fart 
The Fart is one of the five main protagonists of Secret Mountain Fort Awesome.

The Fart is a guy who is made out of butts. He has a big butt on his head that moves when he talks, and two blue eyes with eyelashes. He has a butt on his face that serves as his abs and he has three little butts on his chest that serve as the rest of his abs. He has butt cracks on his arms and legs, and butts replacing his hands and feet. He wears a green belt with a golden heart-shaped buckle on it. Ironically, the only place where he doesn't have a butt is on his rear end.

The Fart is the most sensitive and caring out of all the Disgustoids. His tastes and actions are more refined as he tries to make more of an effort to understand the humans and abide by their culture in hopes of abolishing their hatred for disgustoids. He is also the most logical out of all of them, preferring to think things through before just jumping into them.

His abilities are to harden his body as a rock, change his belt into men's brief underwear, super strength, shapeshifting, stronger abs, increase in size, geokinesis, etc.

Gweelok 
Gweelok is one of the five main protagonists of Secret Mountain Fort Awesome. He is the third main character of the show. he is a very intelligent technical nerd who is a walking ball of mucus. He is voiced by Paul Rugg.

Gweelok is a slimy green ball of mucus with a bunch of shiny red pimples and little black hairs. Gweelok also has big black with white pupils,s quinted eyes with big long black thick hairy eyebrows and pink lips with yellow crooked buck teeth. Gweelok has human-like arms with black hair and sharp claws with three fingers. He has two gray metal gadget bracelets on both arms, and is shown without legs, except for in three episodes. He is the smartest person in the group.

However, despite his intelligence, he can also be stubborn and anti-social among others. He sometimes manages to take care of things himself and keeps a tight lid on his emotions. Gweelok also has an ease to lose his temper. As shown in Gweelok Cracks, he becomes red whenever jealous or aggressive, making him quite scary to be around. His social skills are developing quite slowly, and he is able to get around with the bros just fine.

Slog 
Slog is one of the five main protagonists of Secret Mountain Fort Awesome. Slog is a short disgustoid with black fur covering his body and face. He has a large nose with peach colored flesh. He also has sharp teeth and eyes that are large with two red rings inside of it. He usually wears a stained orange shirt with no pants or shoes and has long yellow nails. He is voiced by Steve Little.

Slog is not well educated, making him more vulnerable to the other disgustoids manipulating or taking advantage of him. He's usually quick to follow along with whatever Festro tells him to do, though he sometimes questions the morality of the actions (IE in The Bet) and even tries to encourage Festro to do the right thing (IE in Secret Mountain Fart Awesome) even if that encouragement falls on deaf ears. He takes pride in being completely filthy and not taking a bath.

Despite not being the brightest bulb in the box, he has his moments where he is just as smart as everyone else in Secret Mountain Fort Awesome . A good example of this would be in Festro Gets Glasses where Slog insisted the correct answer to a "3 + 3 =" math problem was "6" to Festro, despite Festro not listening to him or the others. Another example of this would be in Funstro where Slog decides to take charge and develop a plan to get the old Festro back from his sadistic counterpart Funstro.

Slog also has a lot more compassion than the rest of his fellow disgustoids. This can be shown in Gweelok Cracks. All the other disgustoids are wondering about broad topics or selfish needs, but Slog was concerned about Dingle being turned into a basketball. This can also be seen in The Broken Chair. While running around on fire, he stops mid scream to come up to the screen and warn children that he is a cartoon and fire doesn't actually hurt him, but the kids who are viewing the show are real and shouldn't ever play with fire. This also shows Slog constantly breaks the 4th wall. Another example of Slog breaking the 4th wall would be in Labyrinth when he acknowledges the fact that if Gweelok doesn't complete the maze in 10 minutes, him and the others will be stuck with the Troll King forever with commercials.

Dingle 
Dingle is one of the five main protagonists of Secret Mountain Fort Awesome.

Dingle is a small blue disgustoid that is similar in appearance to Gollum from Lord of the Rings. His back is hunched over with long arms and bend hind legs, his teeth are sharp, he has a rather robust chest, big round eyes, and scraggly straight black hair with a bald spot at the top.

Dingles personality is usually quite calm despite his voice sounding a bit crazed. Like Fart, he can serve as a voice of reason sometimes amongst the other disgustoids. It is also shown that Dingle is more intelligent than he gets credit for. An example of this would be in President the Fart where he gives a well thought out presidential speech that brought the rest of the bros to tears. Another example of this would be in The Broken Chair when Dingle explained to Festro what he had been doing all day, and it included activities such as inventing several things, winning a Nobel peace prize, and horseback riding competitions.

However, there is another side to Dingle's personality that can be mischievous and a bit sadistic. An example of this would be in The 6th Disgustoid when Dingle suggests that they should make fake money to solve their debt issues with the land lord. Another example of this would be in Funstro when Dingle suggests something in his usual gibberish voice and Gweelok comments on how illegal the plan he's suggesting sounds.

Uncle Grandpa characters

Main

Uncle Grandpa 
 Uncle Larry Jeff "Bobo" Grandpa, Jr. (voiced by Peter Browngardt, Pendleton Ward in "For Pete! Love, Pen") is a magical shapeshifting humanoid who is the uncle-grandpa of everyone in the world with a large, rectangular head, a brown horseshoe moustache, a pink nose, a propeller hat that talks and an outfit consisting of a white T-shirt, lederhosen with rainbow suspenders, knee high tube socks, and black slippers. His outward appearance is depicted as rather clownish and unsophisticated, but he is well-meaning, fun-loving, supportive, and surprisingly competent when need be. His catchphrase is "Good morning!"

Mr. Gus 
 Little Michael Marshal "Breakfast-Mysterious Gus" Gusford, currently better known as just Mr. Gus (voiced by Kevin Michael Richardson) is usually the voice of reason. He is a large, strong, serious, yet somewhat grouchy green dinosaur (Reptoid) who wears a white tank top, and no pants. was Uncle Grandpa's rival in "Leg Wrestler", but eventually became his friend and bodyguard. He is unfazed by most of Uncle Grandpa's eccentricities and seems to have an even temper despite his roommates, but often loses his temper, especially where Pizza Steve's antics are concerned. He is older, and more mature than Uncle Grandpa. One of Mr. Gus' favorite parts of the day is 9:00 PM, which is his designated bathroom time, and during that period he likes to take a bubble bath and read for an hour. His catchphrase is most likely "You're just sayin' that to get under my skin." as seen in the short "Slice of Life with Pizza Steve - Pizza Party" of the episode "Jorts".

Pizza Steve 
 Little Nacho Pizza Dough James Walter Stevens "Steve" Cheese (voiced by Adam DeVine, Pendleton Ward in 'For Pete! Love, Pen') is an anthropomorphic pepperoni pizza slice with sunglasses and a member of Uncle Grandpa's crew. He is depicted as extremely vain, troublesome, and often brags about how cool and awesome he is, which annoys his friend Mr. Gus. Despite this, he pretends to be very popular and a hit with women. He is a good friend of Uncle Grandpa. Pizza Steve is featured in his own cartoon shorts entitled "A Slice of Life with Pizza Steve", which usually involve Pizza Steve exaggerating his abilities. In "Tiger Trails", he claims to be a black belt in Italian Karate, but he wears the black belt over his eyes instead of around his waist. He also is meant to cheat, like for instance in "Leg Wrestler", he trained Uncle Grandpa, and forced Mr. Gus to do his chores, so uncle Grandpa could Cream him. His catchphrase is likely "I'm like a modern-day Thomas Einstein except a brazillion times better!", as seen in the short "Slice of Life with Pizza Steve - Speed Cycle" of the episode "Belly Bros".

Giant Realistic Flying Tiger 
 Tiny-Giant Realistic Flying Baby Tiger (often referred to by her initials, T-GRFBT) is a static photographic cutout of a tiger that Uncle Grandpa rides on to get around. She is the only female member of Uncle Grandpa's crew. Tiger is his pet and other best friend, and while she exhibits normal tiger traits such as only being able to communicate by roaring, she is able to fly and leaves a rainbow trail as she goes. The rainbow trail is also expelled from Tiger's rear end when she passes gas. Her personality is a cross between that of a stereotypical teenage girl, a house cat, and a real-life tiger. In order for Tiger's emotions to be shown, only certain parts of her body (specifically her facial ones) are animated. This is done in a stop-motion style.

Belly Bag 
 Baby Belly Bag (voiced by Eric Bauza) is Uncle Grandpa's talking red cyborg fanny pack and best friend who carries all of his priceless valuables, especially Uncle Grandpa's weapon of choice, which is a UG-series robotic laser hammer named Samantha. Belly Bag's insides contain many weird objects and dimensions, including a castle where Frankenstein lives. Despite being practically attached to Uncle Grandpa, he has the ability to walk and can produce multiple hands from inside his body. He even has the ability to see despite having no visible eyes. In the second Uncle Grandpa short "Secret Mountain Uncle Grandpa", he is referred to as Fanny Pack and voiced by Paul Rugg. His catchphrase is "What's cookin', good-lookin'?"

Recurring

Tiny Miracle 
 Tiny Michael "Miracle" Grandpa the Robot Boy (voiced by Tom Kenny) is Uncle Grandpa's imaginary ROBO-UG-JUNIOR model robot grandson that can perform tiny miracles by just a series of unnecessary moves and then technically performing one only to lead up to another tiny miracle. He sounds like a 1980s microphone. According to Uncle Grandpa, he is his trusty robot helper buddy. He can be summoned by a person saying something that includes the words "tiny miracle" in it and then the task he/she is attempting. His catchphrase is "Did somebody say Tiny Miracle?"

Beary Nice and Hot Dog Person 
 Beary Nice (voiced by Audie Harrison) and Hot Dog Person (voiced by Eric Bauza) are the stars of their own recurring segment, "New Experiences". Beary is an anthropomorphic teddy bear with a red nose and a bow tie and Hot Dog Person is an anthropomorphic cyborg frankfurter with a face. Beary has a positive outlook on life while Hot Dog Person is more gloomy. Each of their segments consist of the two of them trying something different for the first time (taking a bath, getting a haircut, etc.). Beary is always excited to try whatever they are doing, while Hot Dog Person is more reluctant as it seems every time he tries something new, something bad happens to him. Beary's excitement also leads to him being self-centered, as he is so wrapped up in his own emotions that he pays no attention to Hot Dog Person's plight.

Charlie Burgers 
 Charlie Burgers the Ball-Loving Dog Next Door (voiced by Brian Posehn) – A talking dog that befriends Uncle Grandpa and his friends. He can be well behaved and he enjoys going on adventures with Uncle Grandpa. His catchphrase is "I love my ball!"

Santa Claus 
 Santa Claus (voiced by Bob Joles) is the famous figure for Christmas and revealed to be Uncle Grandpa's brother in the Christmas special. They have had a troubled relationship since 1983.

Baby Frankie 
 Baby "Frankie" Frankenstein (voiced by Mark Hamill) – A tag-along with Uncle Grandpa in his adventures. Because of his condition, he is unable to talk, communicating only through groans. He is usually seated next to Uncle Grandpa in his chair.

Xarna the She-Warrior of the Apocalypse 
 Xarna the She-Warrior of the Apocalypse (pronounced "Zarna") (voiced by Eric Bauza) − An overly-muscular, masculine cyborg girl. She is on a mission to get some gas for the Mad Motorcycle. Her catchphrase is "I don't like your mouth." She is a spoof of Xena the Warrior Princess and She-Ra.

Evil Wizard 
 Evil Wizard (voiced by Rob Schrab) − A wizard that goes around trying to make everyone's day horrible by humiliating them but actually ends up making their lives better. His catchphrase is "Behold! I am Evil Wizard!"

Priscilla Jones 
 Little Priscilla Jones, currently known as Aunt Grandma (voiced by Lena Headey), is Uncle Grandpa's nemesis with a British accent and is the main antagonist of the series who wants revenge on him for ruining her science project and rather than help her played hacky sack instead resulting in her getting second place in the science fair. She prefers to solve children's problems using simple practical solutions, the complete opposite of what Uncle Grandpa does. Her catchphrase is "Beautiful Morning!"

Children and adults

Belly Kid 
 Belly Kid (voiced by Zachary Gordon) – A kid who has a big belly. He was first ashamed of it, but Uncle Grandpa taught him the best features of having a big belly. He appeared in "Belly Bros".

Caleb 
 Caleb (voiced by Jonathan Adams) – A boy that Uncle Grandpa takes out of a math test to go battle Evil Wizard in outer space. He appeared in "Tiger Trails".

Melvin 
 Melvin (voiced by Jarid Root)  – Melvin is a bratty kid who likes to play Space Emperor, with him being the emperor. When Uncle Grandpa accidentally sent him into another dimension, he was sent to a planet where he is the emperor. He discovered what it is like being a servant, and learns his lesson after Emperor Krell bosses him around. He loves dinner sandwiches, and hates mayonnaise. He appeared in "Space Emperor". His catchphrase is "I decide who does what!"

Melvin's Babysitter 
 Melvin's Babysitter (voiced by Grey DeLisle-Griffin) – a teenage girl with braces who babysits Melvin in the episode "Space Emperor".

Eric 
 Eric (voiced by Eric Bauza) – Eric is a kid who does not have a nickname but Uncle Grandpa helps him. Uncle Grandpa helps him be legendary to get his nickname. In the process of becoming legendary he becomes tall and muscular. In the end he gets the nickname, "Cupcake", because he loves cupcakes. He appears in "Nickname".

Mary 
 Mary (voiced by Pamela Adlon) – Mary is a nervous girl. She takes her driver's test, but fails. Uncle Grandpa takes her on a test and helps her pass. Uncle Grandpa gives her her own "Freedom and Independence USA" truck for passing her test. She appears in "Driver's Test".

Dennis 
 Dennis (voiced by Tom Kenny) – Dennis is a kid who wanted to finally pass his teacher's hard class and avoid going to summer school, until Uncle Grandpa comes and eats his homework and putting Dennis in danger of going to summer school. So Dennis and Uncle Grandpa go to Egypt to get a real pyramid to make sure Dennis gets an A+++++-+ on his project. Dennis appears in "Uncle Grandpa Ate My Homework!".

Mrs. Numty 
 Mrs. Numty (voiced by Grey DeLisle-Griffin) – Dennis' teacher. She appears in "Uncle Grandpa Ate My Homework!" and "1992 Called"'.

Guillermo 
 Guillermo (voiced by Eric Bauza) – Guillermo is a kid who had an awesome new bike until the Perpetual Persistence crushed it. So in Uncle Grandpa and Belly Bag's absence Mr. Gus and Pizza Steve help Guillermo by giving him a trashcan and saying it was a "Magical Uncle Grandpa Bike". Guillermo appears in "Uncle Grandpa for a Day".

Susie 
 Susie (voiced by Grey DeLisle-Griffin) – Susie is a little girl who was afraid of the dark, but learned how to combat her fears by imagining herself as a scary monster. She appears in "Afraid of the Dark".

Adam 
 Adam (voiced by Dee Bradley Baker) – Adam is a kid who could not become the master of a very hard video game, until Uncle Grandpa and Pizza Steve shrink to get inside his brain to become better at video games. He would always have his eyes barely open showing that he has been playing videogames too much, and his eyes are sore from playing too much. Adam appears in "Brain Game".

Angry Man Johnson 
 Angry Man Johnson (voiced by Roger Craig Smith) is a grumpy old man who hates Charlie Burgers. Judging by his name, he is always angry at everyone, including Uncle Grandpa. Angry Man Johnson appears in "Charlie Burgers".

Austin 
 Austin (voiced by Carlos Alazraqui) – Austin is a kid who had a lot of imperfections so he asked Uncle Grandpa to turn him into a robot to become the most perfect kid, and to eliminate all imperfections. Austin appears in "Perfect Kid".

Shaquille O'Neal 
 Shaquille O'Neal (voiced by himself) – The former professional basketball player who is an old friend of Uncle Grandpa. In the past, Uncle Grandpa helped Shaq realize his dream of being a stand-up comedian. He appears in "Perfect Kid" after Uncle Grandpa is chased into a comedy club that Shaq was performing at where he helps Uncle Grandpa fight against Austin 2.0, by combining with the audience in a manner similar to a giant robot. Uncle Grandpa finds the jokes Shaq makes to be very funny.

Akira 
 Akira (voiced by Laura Bailey) – Akira is a Japanese kid who wanted to make the best action packed monster movie of all time. Akira appears in "Big in Japan".

Riley 
 Riley (voiced by Scott Menville) – Riley is a teenage boy who fails a test, his father grounds him and demands him to fold laundry all weekend instead of going to a party. He appears in "Grounded".

Josie 
 Josie (voiced by Grey DeLisle-Griffin) – Josie is a girl who was trying to make duck lips for a site called "face hole" and tries to get a lot of followers and likes. Josie appears in "Duck Lips".

Emily 
 Emily (voiced by Kari Wahlgren) - Emily is a girl scout. She didn't know how to earn a badge at anything until Uncle Grandpa taught her. She appears in "Weird Badge".

Isabella 
 Isabella (voiced by Nika Futterman) - Isabella is an Italian girl who is an aspiring inventor but her inventions are useless, so Uncle Grandpa helps her by bringing Leonardo da Vinci there. Isabella appears in "Inventor Mentor".

Pilot

Ham Sandwich Jones 
 Ham Sandwich Jones (voiced by Steven Blum) – A rotund nerdy teenager who started out hating Uncle Grandpa, but later grew to like him. In the Secret Mountain Fort Awesome episode "5 Disgustoids and a Baby", he appeared as less responsive, and more stingy while intensely playing a portable gaming system. He can be seen in the show's intro and has a very brief role in "Big Trouble for Tiny Miracle".

Little Judy Jones 
 Little Judy Jones (voiced by Grey DeLisle-Griffin) – Ham Sandwich's fat mother.

Remo 
 Remo (voiced by Tom Kenny) – A destructive popular kid, who similarly started off hating Uncle Grandpa, but ends up warming up to his antics. He appears in Secret Mountain Fort Awesome episode "Secret Mountain Uncle Grandpa".

Remo's Friends 
 Remo's Friends (voiced by Steve Little and Tom Kenny) – The cool-dude friends of Remo.
 Kev (voiced by Jon Heder) – Kev is a destructive teenager who thought art was dumb until Uncle Grandpa convinced him that art is pretty fun. Kev appears in "Viewer Special". The character originally appeared in a live-action film starring Browngardt called The Last American.

Crazy Driving Man 
 Crazy Driving Man (voiced by Paul Rugg, Kevin Michael Richardson) – A man who wears framed glasses, who is the somewhat "uncool" father of his son Remo. He reappears as a driving instructor in Uncle Grandpas 7th episode, "Driver's Test", and claims to be the father of a crazy driving baby from another universe.

References 

 Perlmutter, David (2018). The Encyclopedia of American Animated Television Shows. Rowman & Littlefield. pp. 669–670. .
 McLean, Thomas (September 11, 2012). "CN Greenlights 'Steven Universe,' 'Uncle Grandpa' Series". Animation Magazine. Retrieved February 8, 2013.
 "Exclusive: Cartoon Network renews 'Steven Universe' and 'Uncle Grandpa' through season 5". ew.com.
 Goldberg, Lesley (July 25, 2014). "Comic-Con Exclusive: Cartoon Network Renews 'Adventure Time,' 'Regular Show,' 3 More". The Hollywood Reporter. Retrieved February 1, 2015.
 "Pete Browngardt on Twitter". twitter.com.
 "'Adventure Time,' 'Regular Show,' 3 More Renewed at Cartoon Network". The Hollywood Reporter. July 7, 2015.
 "Cartoon Network Lied To Us: 'Uncle Grandpa' Is Ending Production". cartoonbrew.com. April 5, 2016.
 Amidi, Amid (June 15, 2010). "Uncle Grandpa by Peter Browngardt". Cartoon Brew. Retrieved August 8, 2013.
 Amidi, Amid (October 3, 2011). ""Secret Mountain Fort Awesome" Talkback". Cartoon Brew. Retrieved August 8, 2013.
 "John K. Draws Uncle Grandpa – Cartoon Brew". Cartoon Brew. Retrieved October 17, 2014.
 Arrant, Chris (July 12, 2011). "Cartoon Network's Series Panels and Events Lineup for Comic-Con International in San Diego". Cartoon Brew. Retrieved August 8, 2013.
 "The Last American". vimeo.com.
 "The world's magical Uncle and Grandpa returns to save Christmas". The Malaysian Insider. December 5, 2014. Archived from the original on January 24, 2015.
 Chaw, Kenneth; Yee, Chiang Kah (December 25, 2014). "What to watch: Christmas and Boxing Day TV highlights". The Star.
 Ritchie, Ruth (December 20, 2014). Zuel, Bernard (ed.). "A critics' Christmas: the best of Yuletide music, TV and film". The Sydney Morning Herald. Fairfax Media. Archived from the original on December 21, 2014.
 Kondolojy, Amanda (December 5, 2014). "Thursday Cable Ratings: Thursday Night Football Tops Night + NBA Basketball, Pawn Stars, Undrafted, Liga MX & More". TV by the Numbers. Tribune Media. Archived from the original on December 18, 2014.
 "Play the New Uncle Grandpa Game, Sneakin' Santa". Turner Broadcasting System. December 1, 2014. Archived from the original on January 24, 2015.
 Milligan, Mercedes (April 1, 2015). "Uncle Grandpa and Steven Universe Crossover Premieres April 2". Animation. Archived from the original on April 2, 2015.
 Amidi, Amid (April 2, 2015). "Steven Universe and Uncle Grandpa Crossover Special Airs Today". Cartoon Brew. Archived from the original on April 3, 2015.
 Metcalf, Mitch (April 3, 2015). "Top 25 Thursday Cable Originals: April 2, 2015". Showbuzz Daily. Archived from the original on April 8, 2015.
 Thurm, Eric (April 1, 2015). "Exclusive Steven Universe Clip: Uncle Grandpa Comes to Town". The A. V. Club. Onion. Archived from the original on April 2, 2015.
 Kaiser, Vrai (April 3, 2015). "Steven Universe Recap: 'Say Uncle'". The Mary Sue. Abrams Media.
 Mercedes, Milligan (May 20, 2015). "Uncle Grandpa Welcomes Guest Directors". Animation. Archived from the original on May 22, 2015.
 Amidi, Amid (May 20, 2015). "Pen Ward, Max Winston, and Others Guest-Direct Uncle Grandpa". Cartoon Brew. Archived from the original on May 21, 2015.
 Metcalf, Mitch (May 22, 2015). "Top 100 Thursday Cable Originals (& Network Update): May 21, 2015". Showbuzz Daily. Archived from the original on June 6, 2015.
 "Uncle Grandpa – 'Total Reality'". Annecy International Animated Film Festival. Archived from the original on June 6, 2015.
 Wolfe, Jennifer (August 15, 2013). "TELETOON Announces Fall Lineup". Animation World Network. Retrieved November 17, 2014.
 Munn, Patrick (March 10, 2014). "Turner UK Unveils 2014 Programming Slate: 4 New Shows For Cartoon Network, New 'Tom & Jerry' Series & More". TV Wise. Retrieved November 17, 2014.
 Higgins, D. (May 5, 2014). "New this week: Continuum, Secret Meat Business, House of Cards finale & Powerpuff Girls 15th anniversary". The Green Room. Foxtel. Archived from the original on May 6, 2014. Retrieved May 6, 2014.
 "Uncle Grandpa: Academy of Television Arts & Sciences – Emmy". Emmys.com. Retrieved December 9, 2013.
 © CITIA. "Annecy > Programme > Index". annecy.org.
 "Annie Awards Nominees". annieawards.org.
 "Preview: Uncle Grandpa #1 - Comic Book Resources". comicbookresources.com. Retrieved June 1, 2015.
 "CNSP 豪華！日米お爺ちゃん大活躍！でんぢゃらすじーさん邪/アンクル・グランパ". Cartoon Network (Japan). Retrieved April 20, 2017.
 Andreeva 2011.
 TV Guide (a).
 Amidi 2013.
 Zahed 2011, p. 45; Television Academy.
 Milligan 2011.
 Zahed 2011, p. 45.
 Turner Broadcasting System 2011–12.
 Neilstein 2011.
 Constant Contact 2011.
 The Futon Critic 2011a.
 The Futon Critic 2011b.
 TV Guide (b).
 iTunes Store.
 Simpson 2011.
 Amidi 2011.
 Koenig 2012.
 O'Leary 2012.
 Krell 2014.
 Annecy International Animated Film Festival.
 Television Academy 2012, p. 10.
 Annie Awards 2011, pp. 16, 39.
 Annie Awards 2013.
 Futon Critic Staff, The (August 4, 2011). "Monday's Cable Ratings: "Pawn Stars" Takes Demos, "The Closer" Wins Total Viewers". TheFutonCritic.com. Retrieved July 18, 2012.
 {Shadow} (August 27, 2011). "Cartoon Network September 2011 Premiere Info". ToonZone. Retrieved July 18, 2012.
 Futon Critic Staff, The (September 27, 2011). "Monday's Cable Ratings: "MNF" Keeps ESPN Unstoppable". TheFutonCritic.com. Retrieved July 18, 2012.
 {Shadow} (September 27, 2011). "Cartoon Network October 2011 Premiere Info". ToonZone. Retrieved July 18, 2012.
 "Monday's Cable Ratings: "MNF" Gets It Done for ESPN". The Futon Critic. October 4, 2011. Retrieved October 4, 2011.
 "Monday's Cable Ratings: "MNF" Posts Second Largest Audience of Season". The Futon Critic. October 12, 2011. Retrieved October 13, 2011.
 Futon Critic Staff, The (October 18, 2011). "Monday's Cable Ratings: "MNF" Goes Untouched for ESPN". TheFutonCritic.com. Retrieved July 18, 2012.
 {Shadow} (October 29, 2011). "Cartoon Network November 2011 Premiere Info". ToonZone. Retrieved July 18, 2012.
 {Shadow} (December 28, 2011). "Cartoon Network January 2012 Premiere Info". ToonZone. Retrieved July 18, 2012.
 {Shadow} (January 28, 2012). "Cartoon Network February 2012 Premiere Info". ToonZone. Retrieved July 18, 2012.
 Next Generation of Animation - Behind The Scenes | Geek Week | Cartoon Network - YouTube
 McLean 2012.
"2012—The Cristal for best TV production". Annecy International Animated Film Festival. Archived from the original on September 27, 2014. Retrieved September 27, 2014.
"39th Annual Annie Awards". ASIFA-Hollywood. December 5, 2011. Retrieved 15 October 2019.
"40th Annual Annie Awards" (PDF). Annie Awards. ASIFA-Hollywood. February 2, 2013. Archived from the original on February 3, 2013. Retrieved August 29, 2014.
"62nd Primetime Emmys Nominees and Winners". Television Academy. Academy of Television Arts & Sciences. Archived from the original on September 27, 2014. Retrieved September 27, 2014.
"64th Annual Primetime Emmy Awards" (PDF). Television Academy. Academy of Television Arts & Sciences. September 15, 2012. Archived (PDF) from the original on October 2, 2014. Retrieved September 27, 2014.
Amidi, Amid (October 3, 2011). "Secret Mountain Fort Awesome Talkback". Cartoon Brew. n.p. Archived from the original on September 27, 2014. Retrieved September 27, 2014.
Amidi, Amid (September 2, 2013). "Interview with Uncle Grandpa Creator Pete Browngardt". Cartoon Brew. n.p. Archived from the original on September 27, 2014. Retrieved September 27, 2014.
Andreeva, Nellie (March 23, 2011). "Cartoon Network Announces New Series Slate, DC Nation Block at Upfront". Deadline Hollywood. Penske Media Corporation. Archived from the original on September 27, 2014. Retrieved September 27, 2014.
"Cartoon Network presents a sneak peek episode of Secret Mountain Fort Awesome". Constant Contact. July 28, 2011. Archived from the original on September 27, 2014. Retrieved September 27, 2014.
"Secret Mountain Fort Awesome, Season 2". iTunes Store. Apple Inc. Archived from the original on September 27, 2014. Retrieved September 27, 2014.
O'Leary, Shannon (May 15, 2012). "How Cartoon Network Became a Haven for Some of the Best Independent Comic Book Creators Working Today". Publishers Weekly. PWxyz. Archived from the original on August 4, 2014. Retrieved January 23, 2015.
Krell, Jason (April 18, 2014). "How Pendelton Ward and His Friends Created a New Era of Cartoons". io9. Gawker Media. Archived from the original on September 24, 2014. Retrieved January 23, 2015.
Koenig, Abby (August 31, 2012). "Celebrity Voice Suggestions for Cartoon Network". Houston Press. Voice Media Group. Archived from the original on January 13, 2013. Retrieved January 23, 2015.
Secret Mountain Fort Awesome. Cartoon Network. Turner Broadcasting System. August 1, 2011 – February 17, 2012.
"Secret Mountain Fort Awesome". TV Guide. CBS Interactive. Archived from the original on September 27, 2014. Retrieved September 27, 2014.
"Secret Mountain Fort Awesome Season 2 episodes". TV Guide. CBS Interactive. Archived from the original on September 27, 2014. Retrieved September 27, 2014.
McLean, Thomas J. (September 11, 2012). "CN Greenlights Steven Universe, Uncle Grandpa Series". Animation Magazine. n.p. Archived from the original on September 27, 2014. Retrieved September 27, 2014.
Milligan, Mercedes (September 26, 2011). "Secret Mountain Fort Awesome Blows Up CN". Animation Magazine. n.p. Archived from the original on September 27, 2014. Retrieved September 27, 2014.
"Monday's Cable Ratings: Pawn Stars Takes Demos, The Closer Wins Total Viewers". The Futon Critic. Futon Media. August 4, 2011. Archived from the original on September 27, 2014. Retrieved September 27, 2014.
"Monday's Cable Ratings: MNF Keeps ESPN Unstoppable". The Futon Critic. Futon Media. September 27, 2011. Archived from the original on September 27, 2014. Retrieved September 27, 2014.
Neilstein, Vince (September 26, 2011). "Early Man's Early Mike Composing Metal Cartoon Score". MetalSucks. n.p. Archived from the original on September 27, 2014. Retrieved September 27, 2014.
Simpson, Aaron (September 15, 2011). "Watch Clips from Secret Mountain Fort Awesome". Lineboil. n.p. Archived from the original on October 1, 2014. Retrieved October 1, 2014.
Zahed, Ramin (October 7, 2011). "Rising Stars of Animation: 2011". Animation Magazine. n.p. 25 (8): 37–46. Archived from the original on September 27, 2014. Retrieved September 27, 2014.

Secret Mountain Fort Awesome and Uncle Grandpa
Secret Mountain Fort Awesome and Uncle Grandpa
Cartoon Network franchises
Television characters introduced in 2011
Television characters introduced in 2013
Characters